Lieutenant General Sir Michael Compton Lockwood Wilkins,  (4 January 1933 – 25 April 1994) was a senior Royal Marines officer who served as Lieutenant Governor of Guernsey from 1990 to 1994.

Military career
Wilkins joined the Royal Marines in 1951. He was appointed Commander of 3 Commando Brigade in 1979, Chief of Staff of the Royal Marines in 1981 (a post he held during the Falklands War and during which he was Acting Commandant General following the attack on Lieutenant General Sir Steuart Pringle), and Commander of Commando Forces in 1982. He went on to be Commandant General Royal Marines in 1984 before retiring in 1987. In retirement he became Lieutenant Governor of Guernsey and died in office.

Wilkins lived at Coombe Hill in Devon.

References

|-

1933 births
1994 deaths
Royal Navy personnel of the Falklands War
Knights Commander of the Order of the Bath
Officers of the Order of the British Empire
Royal Marines generals